Búnker 2 de Camposoto is a bunker located in San Fernando in the Province of Cádiz, Andalusia, Spain.

Buildings and structures in San Fernando, Cádiz